Keil is a surname, and may refer to:

Alfredo Keil (1850–1907), Portuguese romantic composer and painter
Alphonso Keil (1944–2008) Samoan-born rock & roll musician, founding member of The Zodiacs and The Kavaliers
Birgit Keil (born 1944), German prima ballerina
Eliza Keil, Samoan-born singer and member of Keil Isles
Ernst Keil, (1816–1878), German publisher and founder of Die Gartenlaube
Herma Keil, Samoan-born rock & roll singer of the 1960s and lead singer of the Keil Isles
Francisco Keil do Amaral (1910–1975), Portuguese architect, composer, painter, and photographer
Franz von Keil (1862–1945), Austrian naval officer
Freddie Keil (19??–1994), Samoan-born rock & roll singer and lead singer of the Keil Isles
Heinrich Keil (1822–1894), German classical philologist
Johann Friedrich Karl Keil (1807–1888), German Bible commentator
Josef Keil (1878–1963), Austrian historian, epigrapher, and archaeologist
Klaus Keil (born 1934), American astronomer and father of Mark Keil
Lillian Kinkella Keil (1916–2005), American flight nurse
Mark Keil (born 1967), American tennis player and son of Klaus Keil
Olaf Keil(born 1934), Samoan-born guitarist, founder of the Keil Isles and custom guitar builder 
Peter Keil (born 1942), German painter
Susanne Keil (born 1978), German hammer thrower
William Keil (1812–1877), American founder of communal religious societies

See also
Keil (company), technology company
Keil School, Dumbarton, Scotland
Keils, Jura, Argyll and Bute, Scotland
Kiel, Schleswig-Holstein, Germany

German toponymic surnames
German-language surnames
Occupational surnames
Surnames from nicknames